Jack Baird (born 7 February 1996) is a Scottish professional footballer who plays as a defender for Greenock Morton.

Career
Baird made his first team debut for St Mirren on 22 November 2014, in a 3–0 defeat to Hamilton Academical. On 14 May 2015, Baird signed a two–year extension to his contract, tying him to the club until the summer of 2017.

After establishing himself as a first team regular over the past few years, Baird signed a new one-year deal in May 2017. Baird signed a further one-year extension to his contract in January 2018, tying him to the club until the summer of 2019 after showing impressive form.

In January 2019, Baird signed a further two-year contract extension meaning that he will be at the club until the summer of 2021.

He moved on loan to Greenock Morton in September 2019. The loan agreement was originally due to expire in January 2020, but it was later extended to the end of the 2019–20 season.

On 3 September 2020 Baird left St Mirren club by mutual consent. The next day he signed for Ayr United. In May 2022, Baird signed a pre-contract agreement with fellow Scottish Championship side Greenock Morton.

Career statistics

References

1996 births
Living people
Scottish footballers
St Mirren F.C. players
Greenock Morton F.C. players
Ayr United F.C. players
Scottish Professional Football League players
Association football defenders
Footballers from Glasgow